Stary ́ Dze ́dzin (also spelled Sta ́ry De ́din, also transliterated Old Dzedzin, Old Dedin;) is a village in the Klimavichy District of the Mogilev Region of Belarus. It is situated on the right bank of the Ostyor River (left tributary of the Sozh River), five kilometers from the state border with the Russian Federation. It is situated in five kilometers to the north from the road “Ivatsevichy – Babruysk – Krychaw – on the railway line that forms the border with Russia” .

Origin of Name

According to  local legend, the first settler of this area was an old man (“dzed” in Belarusian), who lived for 125 years. Hence, “Dzedzin” comes from the word “dzed”. The scientists think that the name comes from the word “dzedzina” which was used several centuries ago and meant a type of feodal household that transferred from the grandfather (also called “dzed” in Belarusian) to the grandson. Thus “dzedzina” literally means “grandfather’s”. So at first it was a center of patrimony. Later, another village with the same name appeared nearby and people began to call them Stary (Old) Dzedzin and Novy (New) Dzedzin. These full names conserve today.

History of Village

Archeological investigations discovered that the first appearance of man in this area took place in the Paleolithic. Several thousand years ago these territory was inhabited by Finnic peoples that is evident by the name of the Ostyor River that has Finnic origins. First Indo-Europeans approximately came here in the 2nd millennium BC, probably from the south, going up the Dnieper, the Sozh River and their tributaries. Those people were ancestors of modern Baltic people. First Slavic people came here from south the same way approximately in 8th-9th centuries, they were the Radimichs. But in the nearby area were found the traces of Krivichs, another Slavic group of tribes, who lived to the north. This shows that this area could be a mixed ethnic zone. Archeological investigations in 1926 of several tumuli (kurgans) near the village discovered Radimichs’ burial sites referred to 10th-13th centuries.

Dzedzin’s treasure (see below) buried here in late 10th century can be considered as evidence that a settlement existed on this place at those times but that it was not necessarily a predecessor of Stary Dzedzin itself. Nevertheless, 985 was taken as a symbolic date of its foundation. In August 2010 the 1025th anniversary of the village was solemnly celebrated. A settlement under the name “Dzedzin” was first mentioned in the documents of 16th century. Archeologists discovered the traces of houses that were built in 14th-18th centuries.

In the 12th-14th centuries this area belonged to the Principality of Smolensk, in the 14th century it became a part of the Grand Duchy of Lithuania, then was later included in the Mścisław Voivodeship. At the time of Muscovite-Lithuanian Wars it was situated near the new frontier and suffered from the wars of the next two centuries. In 1740-1744 Stary Dzedzin probably was touched by the Krychaw peasant rebellion under Vasil Vashchyla.

Stary Dzedzin became part of the Russian Empire after the first partition of Polish-Lithuanian Commonwealth in 1772. At the time of the First World War and the Soviet-Polish War the village was located near the front line, but wasn’t touched by it.

Stary Dzedzin became part of the BSSR in 1924, after the first enlargement of the territory of the republic.

At the time of the Second World War the village was occupied by German troops in early August 1941 and liberated in the late September 1943. 138 inhabitants of Dzedzin died in this war.

Local Traditions

The natives from the village conserve traditions that their ancestors followed for centuries. Halina Brykava for forty years heads a folklore-ethnographic ansamble “Astranka” that gained its name after the river Astsyor. Its participants collect local folksongs and perform them. The scientists from the Leningrad University came here several times to listen and record these songs.

Local traditions of pottery and weaving supports Vera Terentyevna Stalyarova.

Stary Dzedzin is famous for its ancient ritual of claiming for rain. When the weather is very dry the women “plough” the Ostyor River and sing special songs that first time were dedicated to claim for the spirit of rain. This ritual has very deep pagan roots.

Treasure of Stary Dzedzin

Stary Dzedzin became famous after one of the oldest monetary treasures on the territory of Belarus was found there.

In 1926 a peasant named Traphim Hudkou found a pot full of ancient coins while working on his land. Ales and Pavel Prudnikau wrote an article in the newspaper “Belarusian village” about it. Scientists decided to explore it and the treasure was sent to Minsk. After a special analysis it was concluded that the treasure was buried between 980 and 985, and contained 204 ancient coins: 201 Kufic dirhams, 2 German denarii and 1 miliaresion among them. Dirhams were printed in Antioch, Baghdad, Hamedan, Isfahan, Balkh, Samarkand, Bukhara and other places. Probably, this treasure belonged to the rich merchant and was buried here in the secret place because this area could be a collateral line of the trade route from the Varangians to the Greeks.

This treasure was kept in the Belarusian State Museum but during the Second World War it was lost.

In 2010 a memorial sign about Dzedzin’s treasure was established in Dzedzin.

Notable natives

Notable persons from Stary Dzedzin include:

 Ivan Dzemidzenka, doctor of veterinary medicine, professor, honoured scientist of BSSR
 Mikalay Kavalyow, doctor of veterinary medicine, professor
 Lidziya Kirpichenka, honoured teacher of BSSR
 Vital Makhanko, ingeneur-constructor of rockets of the S.P. Korolev Rocket and Space Corporation Energia
 Ales Prudnikau, Belarusian poet
 Pavel Prudnikau, Belarusian poet, honoured worker of culture of the Republic of Belarus

External links and literature

 

 Памяць: Гіст.-дакум. хроніка Клімавіцк. р-на. – Мн.: Універсітэцкае, 1995. – 645 с.: іл. (The book “Memory”, Klimavichy rayon; Belarusian)

References

Populated places in Mogilev Region
Klimavichy District
Villages in Belarus